Shyamol Chhaya (English: The Green Shade) is a Bangladeshi Bengali-language film. It was released on 16 December 2004. Written and directed by Humayun Ahmed. Stars Humayun Faridi, Challenger, Riaz, Monir Khan Shimul, Ahmed Rubel, Tania Ahmed, Meher Afroz Shaon, Dr.Ezazul Islam,  Faruque Ahmed, Shadhin Khosru, Shamima Nazneen, Hosne Ara Putul, Rahmat Ali and many more. It reflects a story of the Bangladesh War of Independence, 1971.

Shyamol Chhaya was Bangladesh's submission to the 78th Academy Awards in the 'Foreign Language Film' category. It was not nominated.

This is the story of a group of people leaving their homes to escape the tyrannical Pakistani military during the 1971 Bangladesh Liberation war. The story focuses on the diverse group of characters as they make their way by boat, with the shadow of war constantly present in the background. As the journey progresses alongside the war, we see the character development of the passengers, as the war and their journey pushes them to their most extreme selves.

Cast
 Humayun Faridi
 Challenger
 Riaz as Maulana
 Monir Khan Shimul as a Bengali-German engineer
 Tania Ahmed as Ratri
 Meher Afroz Shaon as Ashalata
 Ahmed Rubel as Pitamber
 Dr.Ezazul Islam as a boatman addressed as Ustad by Kallu 
 Faruque Ahmed as Kallu, Ustad's sidekick and assistant boatman
 Shadhin Khosru as Gaurango, Ashalata's husband
 Shamima Nazneen
 Hosne Ara Putul as Putul
 Rahmat Ali
 Syed Akhtar Ali
 Jasmine Parvez
 Guest Appearance
 Zahid Hossain Shovon as Ratri's Husband

Release

Festivals
 6th Bangladesh Film Festival 2005. London
 11th Kolkata Film Festival 2005. India
 International Palm Spring Film Festival 2006. USA
 The 32nd Seattle International Film Festival 2006. USA
 FIBOFEST Film Festival, Prague, 2006. Czech Republic
 East End Film Festival 2006. London
 East London Film Festival 2006. London
 South Asian Film Festival 2009. GOA, India.
 Film Festival Featuring Liberation War Kolkata 2010. India

Critical response

Robert Koehler of Variety gave the film a negative review, calling it "symbolic to a fault", and saying Humayun Ahmed didn't have the directorial skills to enliven the story.

Awards and achievement
The Bangladesh Federation of Film Societies (BFFS) chose Shyamol Chhaya as the Bangladeshi submission to the 78th Academy Awards in the 'Foreign Language Film' category. The Academy of Motion Picture Arts and Sciences did not select it as one of the five nominees in 2006.

6th Bangladesh Film Festival
 Winner Best Contemporary Film - 2005. London

Bachosach Film Awards
 Winner Best supporting Actress - Tania Ahmed

Home media
Shyamol Chhaya film's VCD and DVD copy rights were taken by G-Series.

References

External links
 
 Shyamol Chhaya at The  Rotten Tomatoes

2004 films
2000s war drama films
Bengali-language Bangladeshi films
Bangladeshi war drama films
Films based on Bangladeshi novels
Films scored by Maksud Jamil Mintu
Films set in 1971
Films based on the Bangladesh Liberation War
Films directed by Humayun Ahmed
2000s Bengali-language films
2004 drama films
Impress Telefilm films